Rubycon may refer to:
 Rubycon (album), an album by Tangerine Dream
 Rubycon, an Australian rock band, which became Slow Turismo in 2015
 Rubycon (company), a Japanese electronic component manufacturer

See also
 Rubicon (disambiguation)
 Rubicon, a river known to the Romans